Elophila tenebralis is a moth in the family Crambidae. It was described by Oswald Bertram Lower in 1902. It is found in Australia, where it has been recorded from Queensland, Western Australia and Northern Territory.

References

Acentropinae
Moths described in 1902
Moths of Australia